Luca Engstler (born 8 March 2000) is a German racing driver currently competing in the WTCR and ADAC TCR Germany Touring Car Championship. Having previously competed in the TCR Middle East Touring Car Series and ADAC Formula 4 amongst others.

Racing career
Engstler began his career in 2009 in Karting, he continued in karting until 2014. In 2015 he switched to the ADAC Formula 4 Series, he continued in the series for 2016 and finished twenty-sixth in the championship standings that year. For 2017 he switched to the ADAC TCR Germany Touring Car Championship, he took his first podiums at the third round of the championship at Oschersleben, where he took two third-place finishes.

In June 2017 it was announced that he would race in the TCR International Series, driving a Volkswagen Golf GTI TCR for his ADAC TCR Germany team Junior Team Engstler.

Since 2017, Engstler has competed in a range of TCR Series including ADAC Germany, Middle East, Asia, Europe, China, Malaysia and the World series. He was the 2019 Middle East champion, 2018 and 2019 TCR Asia champion and 2019 and 2020 TCR Malaysia champion.

He also competed in the 2019 World Touring Car Cup as a wildcard entry at the Slovakia Ring and for BRC Racing Team replacing Augusto Farfus in Macau.

On 16 March 2020, it was announced that Engstler would be driving for Engstler Motorsport alongside BRC Racing Team in a Hyundai i30 N TCR alongside reigning champion Norbert Michelisz, 2018 champion Gabriele Tarquini and Nick Catsburg.

Racing record

Career Summary

†Guest driver ineligible to score points.
* Season still in progress.

Complete TCR International Series results
(key) (Races in bold indicate pole position) (Races in italics indicate fastest lap)

Complete TCR ADAC Germany Touring Car Championship results
(key) (Races in bold indicate pole position) (Races in italics indicate fastest lap)

Complete TCR Middle East Series results
(key) (Races in bold indicate pole position) (Races in italics indicate fastest lap)

Complete TCR Asia Series results
(key) (Races in bold indicate pole position) (Races in italics indicate fastest lap)

Complete TCR Europe Touring Car Series results
(key) (Races in bold indicate pole position) (Races in italics indicate fastest lap)

Complete TCR China Touring Car Championship results
(key) (Races in bold indicate pole position) (Races in italics indicate fastest lap)

Complete TCR Malaysia Touring Car Championship results
(key) (Races in bold indicate pole position) (Races in italics indicate fastest lap)

* Season still in progress.

Complete World Touring Car Cup results
(key) (Races in bold indicate pole position) (Races in italics indicate fastest lap)

† Driver did not finish the race, but was classified as he completed over 90% of the race distance.
‡ As Engstler was a Wildcard entry, he was ineligible to score points.

References

External links
 

2000 births
Living people
German racing drivers
TCR International Series drivers
World Touring Car Cup drivers
24H Series drivers
ADAC Formula 4 drivers
FIA Motorsport Games drivers
Nürburgring 24 Hours drivers
TCR Asia Series drivers
ADAC GT Masters drivers
Audi Sport drivers
Phoenix Racing drivers
Hyundai Motorsport drivers
Engstler Motorsport drivers
TCR Europe Touring Car Series drivers
Deutsche Tourenwagen Masters drivers